Brad Foxhoven is an American film producer and entertainment executive.

Filmography

External links
 
 

American film producers
Living people
Year of birth missing (living people)